The 1999 Asian Youth Boys Volleyball Championship was held in Chiayi City, Taiwan from 20 to 25 April 1999.

Pools composition
The teams are seeded based on their final ranking at the 1997 Asian Youth Boys Volleyball Championship.

Preliminary round

Pool A

|}

|}

Pool B

|}

|}

Final round
 The results and the points of the matches between the same teams that were already played during the preliminary round shall be taken into account for the final round.

Classification 5th–8th

|}

|}

Championship

|}

|}

Final standing

See also
 List of sporting events in Taiwan

References
 www.jva.or.jp

External links
FIVB

A
V
V
Asian Boys' U18 Volleyball Championship